Abbas Hassan (born 1 July 1978) is a former Iraqi football forward who played for Iraq in the 2002 FIFA World Cup qualification. He played for the national team between 2001 and 2003.

On 21 April 2001, Abbas scored his first two goals against Macau.

Career statistics

International goals
Scores and results list Iraq's goal tally first.

References

1978 births
Living people
Association football forwards
Al-Shorta SC players
Iraq international footballers
Iraqi footballers